Dunoon is a town on the Cowal peninsula, in Argyll and Bute in the west of Scotland.

Dunoon may also refer to:

Places
Dunoon, Cape Town, South Africa
Dunoon, New South Wales, Australia

Ships
HMS Dunoon (J52), Royal Navy Minesweeper

Other uses

  
 Dunoon Camanachd, is a shinty club, from Dunoon, Scotland.